Boucheron is a French surname. Notable people with the surname include:

Angelo Boucheron (c. 1780 – 1859), Italian painter and engraver
Brigitte Boucheron
Hugo Boucheron (born 1993), French rower
Jean-Michel Boucheron (disambiguation), multiple people
Maxime Boucheron (1846–1896), French playwright and chansonnier
Michel Boucheron (1903–1940), French rugby union player and coach
Onésime Boucheron (1904–1996), French cyclist
Patrick Boucheron (born 1965), French historian
Raimondo Boucheron (1800–1876), Italian composer

See also
Bernard du Boucheron 

French-language surnames